Thomas Fitzpatrick (1832 – 31 May 1900), born in Virginia, County Cavan, Ireland, became a prominent London physician and member of the Royal College of Physicians. He was the son of James and Elizabeth (née Lawler) Fitzpatrick and born in the Headfort Arms Hotel, Virginia where his parents were the proprietors. From a privileged upbringing Thomas was educated at St. Patrick's, Carlow College, a school well noted for turning out many fine Catholic theologians. However his university education at Trinity College, Dublin enabled him to distinguish himself in medicine where he qualified with a BA in 1853, MA in 1854, MB and MD by 1856. During this time Thomas Fitzpatrick also practiced as a doctor in the Co. Cavan village of Mullagh before entering service during 1856 with the British East India Company as an assistant surgeon, an experience which was to leave a lasting impression on him, through his future attitudes towards primitive medicine, magic and religion.

On his return to England, Thomas Fitzpatrick took up a position with St. Bartholomew's Hospital in London and in 1868 he became a member of the Royal College of Physicians. He took up a private practice near Hyde Park, London and was married to Agnes Letitia (née Robinson) in May 1865. Thomas Fitzpatrick died 31 May 1900 aged 68, after which his wife took to publish some of his writings, Tours and Excursions on the Continent and established the Fitzpatrick Lecture, 'a study in the history of medicine' to his memory at the Royal College of Physicians. Agnes died in 1912, aged 90.

References 

1832 births
1900 deaths
People from County Cavan
Alumni of Carlow College
19th-century Irish medical doctors